John Bertram Stirling (1888–1988) was one of Canada's leading engineers and businessmen in the first half of the 20th century.

He was born in Dundas, Ontario and educated at Queen's University (BA 1909, BSc 1911, LLD 1951), where, among other things, he was a founding member of the Queen's Bands. He served with the Canadian Engineers in France during World War I. He was an internationally renowned engineer, and became president of the Montreal-based EGM Cape and Company Ltd. He served terms as president of the Engineering Institute of Canada, the Montreal Board of Trade, the Canadian Construction Association, and other business organizations.

He was elected as Chancellor of Queen's in 1964. He served in this position until 1974, when he retired at the age of 86. He received the Sir John Kennedy Medal in 1954 and the Order of Canada in 1969. Stirling Hall at Queen's, the physics building, is named in his memory.

Businesspeople from Ontario
1888 births
1988 deaths
Queen's University at Kingston alumni
Chancellors of Queen's University at Kingston
People from Dundas, Ontario
20th-century Canadian engineers
Members of the Order of Canada